The J. M. S. Building is a historic office building located at 108 North Main Street, South Bend, St. Joseph County, Indiana.

Description and history 
It was designed by architect Solon Spencer Beman (1853-1914) and built in 1910. It is an eight-story, Commercial style brick and white terra cotta building with Classical Revival style design elements. It features large round arched windows at the eighth floor and a projecting cornice with brackets on the front facade. The J.M.S. Building was built by John Studebaker (1833–1917), co-founder and later executive of what would become the Studebaker Corporation.

It was listed on the National Register of Historic Places on June 5, 1985.

References

Commercial buildings on the National Register of Historic Places in Indiana
Neoclassical architecture in Indiana
Commercial buildings completed in 1910
Buildings and structures in South Bend, Indiana
National Register of Historic Places in St. Joseph County, Indiana
Chicago school architecture in Indiana